The Eastern Camden County Regional High School District is a limited-purpose, regional public school district for students in ninth through twelfth grades from Berlin Borough, Gibbsboro and Voorhees Township, three communities in Camden County, New Jersey, United States.

As of the 2021–22 school year, the district, comprised of one school, had an enrollment of 2,032 students and 137.0 classroom teachers (on an FTE basis), for a student–teacher ratio of 14.8:1.

The district is classified by the New Jersey Department of Education as being in District Factor Group "GH", the third-highest of eight groupings. District Factor Groups organize districts statewide to allow comparison by common socioeconomic characteristics of the local districts. From lowest socioeconomic status to highest, the categories are A, B, CD, DE, FG, GH, I and J.

The school district has a certified network of 500-plus Apple Macintosh computer workstations. Eastern has a professional staff of more than 200. As a comprehensive secondary school, Eastern is accredited by the New Jersey Department of Education. The average academic class size is 24. Daily student attendance averages more than 92.5% and the annual dropout rate is less than 2%.

History
The origin of the district dates to 1964, when voters in all three sending communities approved a referendum to fund the construction of a high school. 

The original school building with 18 classrooms was constructed on a site covering  at a cost of $1.7 million (equivalent to $ million in ). Prior to opening, students from Berlin Borough attended Edgewood Regional High School, while those from Gibbsboro and Voorhees Township were sent to either Collingswood High School or Haddonfield Memorial High School.

The school opened in 1965, with 35 professional staff and 525 students in grades 9-11 in a building designed to accommodate enrollment of 850. The school was originally divided into schools on the same site: Eastern Intermediate High School (grades 9-10), completed in 1992, and Eastern Senior High School (grades 11-12). There were over 1,000 students enrolled  at Eastern Senior High School. Eastern Intermediate High School had approximately 1,150 enrolled students. In September 2012, the schools merged into one unit with the retirement of Dr. James Talarico in June 2012 and was renamed "Eastern Regional High School" with Robert Tull serving as the principal of the merged school. The oldest parts of the school, which were constructed in 1965, 1970, and 1975 are now the "11-12 Building", and the 1992 addition is referred to as the "9-10 Building".

Schools 
Eastern Regional High School is the district's lone school, serving grades 9-12. As of the 2021–22 school year, the school had an enrollment of 1,998 students.
Robert Tull, Principal

Administration 
Core members of the District's administration are:
Robert S. Cloutier, Superintendent
Kenneth Verrill, Business Administrator / Board Secretary

Board of education
The district's board of education is comprised of nine members who set policy and oversee the fiscal and educational operation of the district through its administration. As a Type II school district, the board's trustees are elected directly by voters to serve three-year terms of office on a staggered basis, with three seats up for election each year held (since 2012) as part of the November general election. The board appoints a superintendent to oversee the district's day-to-day operations and a business administrator to supervise the business functions of the district. Representation on the Board of Education is determined by the population of each of the three sending districts, with six seats allocated to Voorhees Township, two to Berlin Borough and one to Gibbsboro.

References

External links 
Eastern Camden County Regional High School District

School Data for the Eastern Camden County Regional High School District, National Center for Education Statistics

1965 establishments in New Jersey
Berlin, New Jersey
Gibbsboro, New Jersey
New Jersey District Factor Group GH
School districts in Camden County, New Jersey
Voorhees Township, New Jersey
School districts established in 1965